Samuel Martin Kier (July 19, 1813 – October 6, 1874) was an American inventor and businessman who is credited with founding the American petroleum refining industry.  He was the first person in the United States to refine crude oil into lamp oil.  Kier has been dubbed the Grandfather of the American Oil Industry by historians.

Background

Early life

Kier was born in Conemaugh Township, Indiana County, Pennsylvania near the town of Livermore.  He was the son of Thomas Kier and Mary Martin Kier.  The Kiers were Scots-Irish immigrants who owned several salt wells around Livermore and nearby Saltsburg.

In addition to the salt business, Samuel helped found Kier, Royer and Co., in 1838.  The company was a canal boat operation that shipped coal between Pittsburgh and Philadelphia.  Kier also owned interest in several coal mines, a brickyard, and a pottery factory.

He, along with several other investors including Benjamin Franklin Jones, founded several iron foundries in west central Pennsylvania.  The iron business would be the forerunner of the Jones and Laughlin Steel Company, one of the largest steel producers in America.

Later life

Kier married Nancy Eicher of Greensburg, Pennsylvania in 1842.

Salt wells and oil

By the 1840s, Kier's salt wells were becoming fouled with petroleum.  At first, Kier simply dumped the useless oil into the nearby Pennsylvania Main Line Canal, but after an oil slick caught fire, he saw a way to profit from this otherwise worthless byproduct. With no formal training in science or chemistry, he began experimenting with several distillates of the crude oil along with a chemist from eastern Pennsylvania.   He developed a substance he named "Rock Oil" and later "Seneca Oil".  In 1848, he began packaging  the substance as a patent medicine charging $0.50 per bottle. He also produced petroleum butter (petroleum jelly) and sold it as a topical ointment.  Neither product proved to be a commercial success.

After further experimenting, he discovered an economical way to produce kerosene.  Kerosene had been known for some time but was not widely produced and was considered to have little economic value. But at the time whale oil, the principal fuel for lamps in America, was becoming increasingly scarce and expensive.

Kier began selling the kerosene, named "Carbon Oil", to local miners in 1851.  He also invented a new lamp to burn his product.  Kier never obtained a patent for his developments and many other inventors and businessmen would go on to improve upon his work yielding huge fortunes.  Even so, Kier's income at the time exceeded US$40,000 per year, a huge sum for the time.

Kier established America's first oil refinery in Pittsburgh on Seventh avenue near Grant Street, in 1853.  A marker identifying the site reads "Kier Refinery – Using a five-barrel still, Samuel M. Kier erected on this site about 1854 the first commercial refinery to produce illuminating oil from petroleum. He used crude oil from salt wells at Tarentum." Kier consulted with Edwin Drake concerning Drake's experimental oil well and the first shipment of oil from Drake's well went to Kier's refinery.

References

External links
Before gas and oil, petroleum yielded riches in another form

19th-century American businesspeople
Founders of the petroleum industry
1813 births
1874 deaths
People from Indiana County, Pennsylvania
Burials at Allegheny Cemetery